The DBL All-Rookie Team is a team constituted by the best rookies in a season of the Dutch Basketball League, the highest professional basketball league in the Netherlands. This team is based on players' performance throughout the regular season. After the end of the season, the best players are chosen.

Teams

Players named by team

References

All-Rookie Team
Rookie player awards